The 1962–63 Georgetown Hoyas men's basketball team represented Georgetown University during the 1962–63 NCAA University Division college basketball season. Tommy O'Keefe coached them in his third season as head coach, but Georgetown's head coaching position paid so little that he could only coach part-time and held a full-time job outside of coaching in order to meet his financial obligations, impairing his ability to recruit players. The team was an independent and played its home games at McDonough Gymnasium on the Georgetown campus in Washington, D.C. It finished with a record of 13-13 and had no post-season play.

Season recap

After a successful 1961-62 season, Georgetown lost a school-record eight seniors to graduation. The departed players had been responsible for 79.9% of the teams scoring. Only two lettermen returned for 1962-63, and the only starter to return was the point guard, junior guard Jim Christy. In order to complete his roster, O'Keefe had to put five walk-ons on the 1962-63 team and rely on six newcomers in all.

Christy and sophomore forward Jim Barry – newly arrived on the varsity team after a year on the freshman team, and destined to become perhaps the greatest player of Georgetown mens basketballs "Classic Era" (1943-1972) – were the main scoring threats on the team. They scored a combined 1,000 points during the 1962-63 season, and their performance allowed the inexperienced team to avoid a disastrous season in a rebuilding year.

Barry made his varsity debut in the first game of the season against St. Joseph's and scored 29 points, which remains the school scoring record for a debut game. Through the first eight games, he averaged 16.5 points per game, the best on the team. Despite his efforts, however, the Hoyas returned home with a record of 2-7 after losing both their games in the Motor City Classic in Detroit, Michigan. Barry then began to turn in a lengthy list of high-scoring performances, and Georgetown embarked on a six-game winning streak – the longest Georgetown winning streak since the 1952-53 team opened 6-0 – that pushed its record to 8-7. During the streak, Barry averaged 28.9 points per game, and scored 31 points against Loyola and 41 against Navy.

The winning streak ended with Georgetown losing all three games during a tough road trip in which they visited Niagara, Syracuse, and Maryland. Barry averaged 25.7 points per game in the three losses. Coming home with an 8-10 record, the Hoyas began another winning streak, winning five straight to move to 13-10 on the year, with Barry scoring 39 points against Manhattan and 21, 22, 25, and 28 points in the other four wins.

For his part, Jim Christy appeared in 24 games and scored in double figures in 22 of them. His top games of the year included 26 points against Maryland, 34 against Holy Cross, and 32 against Rhode Island.

The Hoyas closed out the season with three straight losses, but Barry had one more great performance. In the second-to-last game of the year, Georgetown visited La Salle at the Palestra in Philadelphia, Pennsylvania, on February 26, 1963. Barry scored 30 points, and Philadelphia-area sportswriters judged it the best performance of the year at the Palestra, exceeding even the accomplishments there of Princetons Bill Bradley and New York Universitys Barry Kramer during the season. Jim Barry ended the season scoring 20 or more points in 16 games and 30 or more points in six games, averaging a school-record 22.8 points per game, fourth among all sophomores in the United States.

The team finished with a record of 13-13, the only team that did not have a winning record in O'Keefes six seasons as head coach. However, it was a creditable record against a tough schedule in a rebuilding year that saw them win 11 of their last 17 games.

The team was not ranked in the Top 20 in the Associated Press Poll or Coaches' Poll at any time.

Roster
From the 1958-59 season through the 1967-68 season, Georgetown players wore even-numbered jerseys for home games and odd-numbered ones for away games; for example, a player would wear No. 10 at home and No. 11 on the road. Players are listed below by the even numbers they wore at home.

Sources

1962–63 schedule and results

Sources

|-
!colspan=9 style="background:#002147; color:#8D817B;"| Regular Season

References

Georgetown Hoyas men's basketball seasons
Georgetown
Georgetown Hoyas men's basketball team
Georgetown Hoyas men's basketball team